Star Wars is a media franchise and shared fictional universe that is the setting of science fiction television series based on characters created by George Lucas. The first two series in the universe, Star Wars: Droids and Ewoks, began airing on ABC in 1985. Cartoon Network's Star Wars series began in 2003 with Star Wars: Clone Wars, followed by Star Wars: The Clone Wars in 2008. Additionally, the universe expanded to Disney XD with Star Wars Rebels in 2014, then to YouTube with Star Wars Forces of Destiny in 2017, and furthermore to Disney Channel with Star Wars Resistance in 2018. Those series will be followed by four live-action series, The Mandalorian, The Book of Boba Fett, Andor, Obi-Wan Kenobi, and Ahsoka set to be released on Disney+.

Droids is headlined by Anthony Daniels as the voice of C-3PO, while Jim Henshaw voices Wicket W. Warrick in the first season of Ewoks with Denny Delk taking over the role for the second season. Clone Wars sees Mat Lucas, James Arnold Taylor, and Tom Kane as Anakin Skywalker, Obi-Wan Kenobi, and Yoda, respectively. Matt Lanter and Ashley Eckstein star as Anakin and Ahsoka Tano in The Clone Wars, along with Taylor and Kane reprising their respective roles as Obi-Wan and Yoda. Taylor Gray is featured as Ezra Bridger in Rebels, while Lupita Nyong'o leads as Maz Kanata in Forces of Destiny and Christopher Sean leads as Kazuda Xiono in Resistance.

Pedro Pascal stars as the title character in The Mandalorian, while Temuera Morrison headlined The Book of Boba Fett reprising his role as Boba Fett from The Mandalorian and other previous Star Wars media. Diego Luna will reprise his role as Cassian Andor in Andor; Ewan McGregor will headline Obi-Wan Kenobi reprising his role as the titular character, where he will be joined by Hayden Christensen as Darth Vader; and Rosario Dawson will star as Ahsoka Tano in Ahsoka.

Animated series

List indicator(s)
This table includes main cast members, recurring characters, as well as notable guest stars who have voice roles in at least two series.
 A dark grey cell indicates the character was not in the series, or that the character's presence in the series has not yet been announced.

Live-action series

See also
 Lists of Star Wars cast members
 List of Star Wars film actors
 Star Wars Holiday Special actors
 Caravan of Courage: An Ewok Adventure actors
 Ewoks: The Battle for Endor actors

References

See also
 List of Star Wars film actors
 Star Wars Holiday Special actors
 Caravan of Courage: An Ewok Adventure actors
 Ewoks: The Battle for Endor actors

External links

Lists of actors by American television series
Lists of actors by science fiction television series